Anandaram Dhekial Phookan College is an undergraduate and postgraduate college established in the year 1959 at South Haibargaon  of Nagaon district in Assam. The college is affiliated to Gauhati University.

Departments

Arts
 Assamese
 Arabic
 Bengali
 Education
 English
 Economics
 History
 Political science
 Philosophy

Science
 Botany
 Chemistry
 Computer science
 Geography
 Herbal Science & Technology
 Mathematics
 Physics
 Statistics
 Zoology

Commerce
 Accountancy

Courses

Undergraduate Courses 
 Bachelor of Arts
 Bachelor of Science
 Bachelor of Commerce
 Bachelor of Computer Applications

Post Graduate Courses 
 Master of Arts in Assamese
 Master of Arts in History
 Master of Science in Herbal Science

UGC Sponsored Courses 
 Fashion Designing
 Diploma in Fashion & Dress Designing Technology (FDDT)
 Certificate Course in Fashion & Dress Designing
 Certificate Course in Electronic Instrument Maintenance
 Certificate Course in Human Rights and Duties
 Certificate Course on Gandhian Studies
 Certificate Course in Web Designing
 Certificate Course in Bio-informatics
 M.Sc. in Herbal Science and Technology

Accreditation
 In 2016 the college has been awarded "A" grade with CGPA 3.11 by National Assessment and Accreditation Council. The college is also recognised by University Grants Commission (India).

 ADP College was given 'Star College' title by Ministry of Science and Technology (India) in the year 2020.

References

External links

Colleges affiliated to Gauhati University
Universities and colleges in Assam
Nagaon district
Educational institutions established in 1959
1959 establishments in Assam